Cemal Mersinli (1875 – October 7, 1941), also known as Mehmed Djemal Pasha, Mersinli Djemal, or Djemal Kuchuk (meaning the lesser Djemal to distinguish him from the higher-ranking Djemal Pasha) was a general of the Ottoman and Turkish armies and a politician of the Ottoman Empire and the Republic of Turkey.

During the Arab Revolt, he led Turkish forces in an attack on Wadi Musa on 21 Oct. 1917.  The Ottoman forces were defeated by forces under the command of Mawlud Mukhlis, Faisal's aide-de-camp.

Medals and decorations
Medal of Independence with Green Ribbon

Sources

External links
 Dursun Gök, Mersinli Cemal Paşa, Atatürk Araştırma Merkezi Dergisi, Sayı 34, Cilt: XII, Mart 1996 

1875 births
1941 deaths
People from Mersin
Ottoman Military Academy alumni
Ottoman Military College alumni
Ottoman Army officers
Ottoman military personnel of the Balkan Wars
Ottoman military personnel of World War I
Politicians of the Ottoman Empire
Government ministers of the Ottoman Empire
Malta exiles
Turkish Army generals
Turkish people of the Turkish War of Independence
Deputies of Isparta
Recipients of the Medal of Independence with Green Ribbon (Turkey)